White Church may refer to:

White Church, Bucharest, Romania
White Church, Iași, Romania
White Church, Karan, Serbia
White Church, Cainhoy, South Carolina, United States

See also
 Whitechurch (disambiguation)
 Whitchurch (disambiguation)